Samuel W. Johnson may refer to:
 Samuel Waite Johnson (1831–1912), English railway engineer
 Samuel William Johnson (1830–1909), Agricultural chemist at Yale
 Sam Johnson (footballer, born 1992), English footballer